USS Illinois may refer to:

 USS Illinois (1864), was a screw sloop-of-war laid down in 1864, but was never completed and broken up for scrap in 1872

See also
 A replica battleship Illinois was a full-scale mockup of an  battleship, created as an exhibit for the 1893 World's Columbian Exposition

United States Navy ship names